The peso was the currency of Guinea-Bissau from 1975 to 1997 and was divided into 100 centavos. It replaced the escudo at par. In 1997, in an effort to stop high inflation, Guinea-Bissau adopted the CFA franc, using a conversion rate of 65 pesos to the franc.

History
The peso replaced the escudo in 1975. It was originally equivalent to the Portuguese escudo.

Historical exchange rates
1975–1976: fixed exchange rate with the Portuguese escudo at parity.
1976–1977: fixed exchange rate with the Portuguese escudo (0.85 GWP = 1.00 PTE)
1977–1978: fixed exchange rate with the Portuguese escudo (0.74 GWP = 1.00 PTE)
26 May 1978–22 December 1983: fixed exchange rate with the special drawing rights at a rate of 44 pesos per SDR.
23 December 1983: Peso devalued to 88 per SDR.
4 May 1987: Peso devalued to 650 per USD.

On December 1996, continued rapid inflation had eroded the value of the peso so that the exchange rate had become 225 pesos per Portuguese escudo.

Coins
Coins were issued in denominations of 50 centavos, 1, 5 and 20 pesos.

Banknotes
Banknotes in denominations of 50, 100, and 500 pesos dated 24-9-1975 (24 September 1975) were issued on 2 March 1976. 1000 peso notes were introduced in 1978, followed by  5000 pesos notes in 1984 and 10,000 pesos notes in 1990.

See also

 Economy of Guinea-Bissau

References

External links
The Bank Notes of Guinea-Bissau by Peter Symes

Currencies of Africa
Economy of Guinea-Bissau
Modern obsolete currencies
1975 establishments in Guinea-Bissau
1997 disestablishments in Guinea-Bissau